Land of Hope may refer to:

 The Land of Hope (1921 film), a lost film by Edward H. Griffith
 The Land of Hope (2012 film), a Japanese drama film by Sion Sono
 Land of Hope (miniseries), a 1986 Australian miniseries
 "Land of Hope" (song), a song by Cold Chisel from the 2019 album Blood Moon
 Land of Hope: Chicago, Black Southerners, and the Great Migration

See also
 Land of Hope and Glory (disambiguation)